Kunming is the capital and largest city of Yunnan province, China.

Kunming may also refer to:

Kunming Airlines, a Chinese airlines based in Kunming
Kunming dialect, a dialect of Southwestern Mandarin Chinese
Kunming dog, a wolf-dog breed of working dog
Kunming Lake (Beijing), the central lake on the grounds of the Summer Palace in Beijing, China
Kunming Lake (Kunming), a lake near Kunming, China
Kunming Subdistrict, a former subdistrict in Zhongshan District, Dalian, Liaoning, China
3650 Kunming, a minor planet
Huang Kunming (born 1956), Chinese politician

See also
 Kunming attack (disambiguation)